Selm Stenvall (May 5, 1914 – May 28, 1995) was a Swedish cross-country skier who competed in the 1930s and 1940s.

Career
Stenvall won a silver medal in the 4 × 10 km relay at the 1939 FIS Nordic World Ski Championships in Zakopane. He also won second place in the 1946 Vasaloppet, with 6:13:53 as his time.

Cross-country skiing results

World Championships
 1 medal – (1 silver)

References

External links
World Championship results 
Vasaloppet results

1914 births
1995 deaths
Swedish male cross-country skiers
FIS Nordic World Ski Championships medalists in cross-country skiing